The Fly Tour was the Dixie Chicks' 2000 debut headlining concert tour in over 80 cities in North America in support of their album Fly.

History
Announced in mid-April 2000, this was the Dixie Chicks' first headlining tour. Moreover, the group was jumping directly to playing mostly in arenas.  Since the sudden jump in the group's success in 1998, they had played as a supporting act for Tim McGraw and as part of the George Strait Country Music Festival and Lilith Fair, seeking to expose themselves to diverse audiences in building a fan base.  The live reputation the group developed for their instrumental prowess and performance strengths led to them embarking upon an ambitious, high-profile, large-venue tour of their own.

Begun at the start of June 2000 with five dates in Canada, and with occasional two-week breaks in between legs, the tour was originally scheduled to end in September. However, after having grossed over $25 million for about 50 dates, and averaging about 13,000 fans per show, it was extended until early December, when it concluded with four dates in the Chicks' native Texas.

In terms of commercial impact, LiveDaily termed the tour "a runaway success", and it came at a time when the country music genre was in a box-office slump.  It represented an innovation in a business sense, as three different promoters were used, covering different geographical regions of the country, rather than the more typical use of a different local promoter at each stop.  Chicks management did this in order to get more consistent messaging in marketing and promotion, which itself was aided by an over $3 million national advertising campaign.  The comically themed commercials showed the Chicks as touring neophytes, learning how to smash banjos and tear up hotel rooms.  Tour sponsors were MusicCountry.com and CMT, while one dollar of each ticket sale was donated to the World Wildlife Fund.

In the end, the Fly Tour grossed over $47 million, with an average attendance of over 12,000. It was the biggest country music tour in 2000 by any single act (trailing only the joint Tim McGraw–Faith Hill Soul2Soul Tour) and the sixth highest-grossing tour of any genre during the year.

For 2000, the tour was nominated for Pollstar's most important award, that of Major Tour of the Year, but lost out to the Bruce Springsteen and the E Street Band Reunion Tour. It did however win Pollstar's Personal Manager of the Year award for the group's manager, Simon Renshaw, who had negotiated the unusual promotion arrangements.

The tour also had a cultural effect: the Encyclopedia of the Great Plains stated that the Fly Tour "gained a life of its own, making the Dixie Chicks a pop-cultural phenomenon, with young and enthusiastic audiences flocking" to see the group.

The show
The shows themselves attracted both parents and their children.  In particular, young girls could be seen dressing as their favorite member of the trio.  Slogans such as "Chicks Rule!" and "Chicks Kick Ass!" were prevalent during the tour.

Production values were emphasized for the show, with eight trucks required to haul it.  A six-man band backed the three Chicks.  Stage and show design involved members of the Cirque du Soleil team, including lighting designer Luc Lafortune. The stage was surrounded by a curtain that resembled a pair of jeans, complete with a working zipper.  Various interactive pre-show activities kept the audience busy, as a huge remote-controlled mechanical fly circled over the audience. Then the show began, by the zipper dropping and the curtain falling away.

The Dixie Chicks' generally performed for about an hour and a half.  The themes of the show veered between love songs and declarations of female independence, with the opener "Ready to Run" and the climactic "Goodbye Earl" both exemplifying the latter.  Video screens would sometimes show the music videos that went with a song, and other times would show humorous interludes, such as the trio's own fashion disasters from the past.  Other stage effects included a night full of stars with a setting moon for "Cowboy Take Me Away", and bubbles representing snow falling from the rafters for "Cold Day in July".  The main set generally finished with what would become a furious concert staple of theirs, "Sin Wagon"; for the encores, "Goodbye Earl" – the song of the moment for Chicks fans – was often performed with the three Chicks spread out among the audience in different corners of the venue, while "Wide Open Spaces" was the occasion for a mass sing-along.

By the later stages of the tour, lead singer Natalie Maines was visibly pregnant with her first child, and was able to rest during the middle section of the show, which featured the trio performing numbers such as Sheryl Crow's "Strong Enough" while sitting on a couch.

Critical reaction to the Fly Tour shows was generally positive.  The New York Times called it "a slick, good-natured show that seesawed between clinging love songs and declarations of female independence."  Rolling Stone said that while the group "can pop and rock with conviction", at other times the show represented "stone-cold, hard-core honky tonk at its best", and that the youthful audience's roars of approval for the sisters' instrumental virtuosity – which it compared to those Eddie Van Halen got for guitar solos – was "damn near revolutionary". Rolling Stone did criticize the "overly ambitious stage and lighting design" for detracting from the on-stage intimacy between the three group members and their backing band, while The University News praised it, saying the show "appealed to the eyes with its unique stage and interesting special effects."  The Daily Universe'''s reviewer called the group "the most exciting country-and-western group I have ever seen," while KAOS2000'' magazine said "this trio of hotties know how to put on a show and definitely had control of the big arena stage."  A Citysearch.com writer said that Maines' voice was not the strongest in performance, but benefited from the joint strength when combined with the sisters'.

Broadcasts and recordings
The August shows at Washington, D.C.'s MCI Center were filmed and used as the basis for an NBC network special called, "Dixie Chicks: On the Fly". The special aired November 20, 2000.

Opening acts
Patty Griffin (select shows)
Ricky Skaggs (select shows)
Joe Ely (September, select shows)
Willie Nelson (October, select shows)
Grupo Vida (October, select shows)
The Maines Brothers Band (Lubbock)

Setlist
"Ready to Run"
"There's Your Trouble"
"Hello Mr. Heartache"
"Don't Waste Your Heart"
"Without You"
"If I Fall You're Going Down with Me"
"I Can Love You Better"
"You Were Mine"
"Give It Up or Let Me Go"
"Video Sequence"
"Let Him Fly"
"Heartbreak Town"
"Strong Enough"
"Brilliancy" (and/or "Roanoke" with a snippet of "Dixie Chicken")
"Let 'Er Rip"
"Tonight the Heartache's on Me"
"Cold Day in July"
"Some Days You Gotta Dance"
"Cowboy Take Me Away"
"Sin Wagon"
Encore 		
"Goodbye Earl"
"Wide Open Spaces"

There were some minor changes to this order depending on the venue and the opening act. "Am I the Only One (Who's Ever Felt This Way)", "Loving Arms", "Truth No.2", and "Merry Christmas From the Family" were also played during the tour.

Tour dates

Cancellations and rescheduled shows

External links
Dixie Chicks Website
Tour Info

References

The Chicks concert tours
2000 concert tours